Morning Constitutions is a 2007 album by American comedian Larry the Cable Guy. It was recorded at the Orpheum Theatre in Minneapolis, Minnesota. It reached #1 on the Top Comedy Albums chart.

Track listing
All material written by Larry the Cable Guy.
 "Bowling Shoes"
 "Just Hitched"
 "I Like Steak"
 "Pie of the Month"
 "Terrorist or Toddler"
 "Gay Mafia"
 "Stool Troubles"
 "Shopping at Wal-Mart"
 "Bed, Beer & a Blonde"
 "Squeal or No Squeal"
 "A Sue Named Boy"
 "Poop Lasagna"

Charts

Weekly charts

Year-end charts

References

Larry the Cable Guy albums
2007 live albums
Warner Records live albums
2000s comedy albums